EarthRights International (ERI) is an American nonprofit human rights and environmental organization founded in 1995 by Katie Redford, Ka Hsaw Wa, and Tyler Giannini.

Cases
 Doe v. Unocal Corp.
 Wiwa v. Royal Dutch Shell Co.
 Doe v. Chiquita Brands International

References

External links
 

1995 establishments in the United States
Organizations established in 1995
International human rights organizations
International environmental organizations